SLC45A1 is a member of the SLC45 family of solute carriers. Analysis of the protein function in a recombinant yeast expression assay show that it can:
(i) transport a disaccharide, such as glucose and sucrose
(ii) perform secondary active transport in a proton-dependent manner.

It is associated with sugar transport in the brain, and rare mutations in the gene are associated with intellectual disability and epilepsy. analogous to the effect of mutation of the cerebral glucose transporter GLUT1(SLC2A1).

References 

Solute carrier family